Daniel Ytterbom (born 18 September 1976) is a Swedish professional footballer, currently player as a forward for Sjötulls BK.

Ytterbom began his career with Gefle IF, turning professional in 1993, having played for their Under-19 side. He had a trial with Torquay United in October 1999, but returned to Gefle and remained there until joining Sjötulls BK in January 2007.

References

1976 births
Living people
Swedish footballers
Gefle IF players

Association football forwards